The following lists events that happened in 1937 in El Salvador.

Incumbents
President: Maximiliano Hernández Martínez 
Vice President: Vacant

Events

References

 
El Salvador
1930s in El Salvador
Years of the 20th century in El Salvador
El Salvador